Carl Olaf Bue Jr. (March 27, 1922 – December 24, 2020) was a United States district judge of the United States District Court for the Southern District of Texas.

Education and career

Born in Chicago, Illinois, Bue received a Bachelor of Philosophy degree from Northwestern University in 1951 and a Bachelor of Laws from the University of Texas School of Law in 1954. He served as a captain in the United States Army Adjutant General's Department, during World War II, from 1942 to 1946. He was in private practice at Royston Rayzor in Houston, Texas, from 1954 to 1970.

Federal judicial service

On August 11, 1970, Bue was nominated by President Richard Nixon to a seat on the United States District Court for the Southern District of Texas vacated by Judge Joe McDonald Ingraham. Bue was confirmed by the United States Senate on October 13, 1970, and received his commission on October 15, 1970. He assumed senior status on September 2, 1987. He died on December 24, 2020, aged 98.

See also
 List of United States federal judges by longevity of service

References

Sources
 

1922 births
2020 deaths
20th-century American judges
21st-century American judges
Judges of the United States District Court for the Southern District of Texas
Northwestern University alumni
United States Army officers
United States Army personnel of World War II
United States district court judges appointed by Richard Nixon
University of Texas School of Law alumni